Olympian spirits (or Olympic spirits, Olympick spirits) refers to seven (or sometimes fourteen) spirits mentioned in several Renaissance and post-Renaissance books of ritual magic/ceremonial magic, such as the Arbatel de magia veterum, The Secret Grimoire of Turiel and The Complete Book of Magic Science. The Arbatel of Magick says of the Olympian spirits: "They are called Olympick spirits, which do inhabit in the firmament, and in the stars of the firmament: and the office of these spirits is to declare Destinies, and to administer fatal Charms, so far forth as God pleaseth to permit them."

In this magic system, the universe is divided into 196 provinces (a number which in numerology adds up to 7: 1+9+6=16; 1+6=7) with each of the seven Olympian spirits ruling a set number of provinces. Aratron rules the most provinces (49), while each succeeding Olympian rules seven fewer than the former, down to Phul who rules seven provinces. Each of the Olympic spirits rules alternately for 490 years. Each Olympian spirit is also associated with one of the seven luminaries which figure in ancient and medieval Western magic.

The seven Olympian spirits
Aratron (or Arathron), "the alchemist who commanded seventeen million six hundred and forty thousand spirits". He rules 49 provinces. His planet is Saturn.
 Bethor, "who commanded twenty-nine thousand legions of spirits". He rules 42 provinces. His planet is Jupiter.
 Phaleg (or Phalec, Pharos), "the War-Lord". His planet is Mars. He rules 35 provinces.
 Och, "the alchemist, physician, and magician". He rules 28 provinces. His "planet" is the Sun.
 Hagith, "transmuter of metals, and commander of four thousand legions of spirits". He rules 21 provinces. His planet is Venus.
 Ophiel, "who commanded one hundred thousand legions of spirits". He rules 14 provinces. His planet is Mercury.
 Phul, "lord of the powers of the moon and supreme lord of the waters". He rules 7 provinces. His "planet" is the Moon.

The seven archangels and the seven Olympian spirits
In ritual magic, the seven Olympian spirits are not confused with the seven traditional archangels, which usually are Michael (usually the Sun), Anael (Venus), Raphael (usually Mercury), Gabriel (the Moon), Cassiel (Saturn), Samael (Mars) and Zadkiel (Jupiter), or a variation thereof.

The seven Olympian spirits are often evoked in conjunction with the seven classic archangels, and magic seals often associate one of the classic seven with one of the Olympian spirits. For example, a magic seal from Frederick Hockley's The Complete Book of Magic Science shows the form of a seal which binds a spirit of Jupiter, Pabiel, to the magician: Pabiel's name appears in a band stretched between two circles: the circle on the left bearing the name and sigil of Bethor, the circle on the right bearing the name and sigil of Sachiel (equivalent to Zadkiel).

See also
 Archangel
 Hierarchy of angels
 Twelve Olympians
 Seven archangels

References

External links 
 Davidson, Gustav, A Dictionary of Angels, Including the Fallen Angels. 1967. Free Press, 
 Hall, Manly Palmer, The Secret Teachings of All Ages, 1928; Diamond Jubilee Edition, 1988. Pgs. 103-104.
 Agrippa von Nettesheim, Heinrich Cornelius, 1486?-1535., Arbatel De magia veterum (Arbatel: Of the Magic of the Ancients), digital edition. Joseph H. Peterson.